Daniel Webber may refer to:

Danny Webber (born 1981), English footballer
 Daniel Webber (actor) (born 1988), Australian actor